Shaun Bartlett (born 31 October 1972) is a South African professional football manager and former player who is the manager of Cape Town Spurs. During his playing career, he played as a striker.

Early life

Born in Cape Town, Bartlett was raised by his grandmother in Factreton on the Cape Flats. He began playing for his church team and quickly developed a deft striking ability on the field. He was also a talented cricketer.

Club career
Bartlett began his career with his hometown Cape Town Spurs and then moved to Major League Soccer and the Colorado Rapids in the league's inaugural season in 1996. Halfway through the 1997 season, he was traded to the MetroStars on 10 July. Bartlett left MLS, without leaving much of a mark and returned to his home country. He later went on loan to FC Zürich and then transferring there for good in 1998. He went on loan to Charlton Athletic in 2000, and moved there in 2001 on a permanent deal worth £2 million. Bartlett won the Premier League Goal of the Season award in 2000–01, for his volley against Leicester City. He was released by the club in May 2006.

Bartlett then returned to South Africa signing with Kaizer Chiefs and in the summer of 2008 retired from professional football. After several discussions, he then made a return to football with Bloemfontein Celtic.

International career
Bartlett made his full international debut for the South Africa national team in a friendly against Lesotho on 26 April 1995.

He is the second all-time leading scorer behind Benni McCarthy for South Africa, with 28 goals in 74 appearances. He helped his country to the 1996 African Nations Cup and played in the 1998 FIFA World Cup, scoring two goals.

Managerial career
In October 2021, Bartlett was appointed as manager of National First Division side Cape Town Spurs.

Personal life
Bartlett's wedding was attended by Nelson Mandela. To avoid excess attention, only he and his bride knew that the politician was coming. Bartlett's son, Tyrique is also a footballer.

Career statistics

Club

International
Scores and results list South Africa's goal tally first, score column indicates score after each Bartlett goal.

Honours

Player
FC Zürich
 Swiss Cup: 2000

Kaizer Chiefs
 Telkom Knockout: 2007
 MTN 8: 2008

South Africa
 African Cup of Nations: 1996

Individual
 BBC Goal of the Season: 2000–01

Manager
Golden Arrows
 National First Division: 2014–15

References

Living people
1972 births
South African soccer players
South Africa international soccer players
South African expatriate soccer players
Vasco da Gama (South Africa) players
Colorado Rapids players
New York Red Bulls players
Charlton Athletic F.C. players
Premier League players
Major League Soccer players
1996 African Cup of Nations players
2000 African Cup of Nations players
2002 African Cup of Nations players
1998 FIFA World Cup players
FC Zürich players
Soccer players from Cape Town
Association football forwards
Kaizer Chiefs F.C. players
Swiss Super League players
Expatriate footballers in England
Expatriate soccer players in the United States
Expatriate footballers in Switzerland
Cape Coloureds
Bloemfontein Celtic F.C. players
South African expatriate sportspeople in England
South African expatriate sportspeople in the United States
South African expatriate sportspeople in Switzerland
South African soccer managers